Rencunius is a genus of adapiform primate that lived in Asia during the late middle Eocene. It includes the species Rencunius zhoui.

References

Literature cited

 

Prehistoric strepsirrhines
Eocene mammals of Asia
Fossil taxa described in 1994
Eocene primates
Monotypic prehistoric primate genera
Prehistoric primate genera